Voznesenka (Russian: Вознесенка) is a small unincorporated community in the Kenai Peninsula Borough 23 miles northeast of Homer, Alaska, United States.

Brief overlook
The village was founded in 1985 by residents who decided to leave Nikolaevsk and begin new settlements in the Kachemak Bay area. The name in Russian means Ascension (вознестись, voznestis' – to ascend) referring to the holiday of the Ascension. The village is situated on a bluff over Kachemak Bay, and is at the end of the maintained road system on the western Kenai Peninsula. A switchback trail leads about  down to the beach; it can be traveled by foot or 4-wheel drive vehicle except at the highest tides to reach the neighboring village of Kachemak Selo. There are more than 40 families living in Voznesenka. Although unincorporated, the community has a mayor, a community council, and a water-utility board. There is also a community church and a public school in the village. the school maintains a student population of roughly 115 students. The community also had a wrestling and football team which lasted through 2018. Emergency services are provided by Kachemak Emergency Services Area Fire and EMS. The community is accessible by gravel road, the paved access road from Homer ending where the village begins. In 2009 the Mile 17 fire threatened the village. There are two more villages that Russian Old Believers live in. Those villages are Razdolna and Kachemak Selo.

References

1985 establishments in Alaska
Old Believer communities in the United States
Populated coastal places in Alaska on the Pacific Ocean
Populated places established in 1985
Russian-American culture in Alaska
Russian communities in the United States
Unincorporated communities in Alaska
Unincorporated communities in Kenai Peninsula Borough, Alaska